Deh-e Abdollah (also Romanized as Deh-e ‘Abdollāh and Deh ‘Abdollāh; also known as Deh ‘Abdullāh and Deh Rezā) is a village in Malmir Rural District, Sarband District, Shazand County, Markazi Province, Iran. At the 2006 census, its population was 50, in 13 families.

References 

Populated places in Shazand County